The Cathedral of the Nativity of the Blessed Virgin Mary is the cathedral of the  of the Russian Orthodox Old-Rite Church. It was built between 1990 and 1999. The cathedral is located in Zayeltsovsky District, Novosibirsk.

History
The design was drawn up in 1989 by architects A.P. and E.A. Dolnakov.

On September 21, 1990, Metropolitan of Moscow and All Russia  consecrated a place for the construction of the church near Bestuzhev Street in Zayeltsovsky District.

A professional team of builders was hired only for the construction of foundations. The entire construction was carried out by an experienced builder O. F. Glebkin. The walls of the cathedral were built by parishioners Roman Bekrenyov and Boris Kokorin.

The auxiliary workers who participated in the construction were also parishioners: A. Bozhenkov, F. A. Ustinov, V. E. Shevyakov, N. A. Gaevsky, D. Gorenko, P. N. Lebedev; the Borisov brothers fenced the construction site with a metal fence and laid the cable.

Tomsk Old Believers helped build the temple: A. Volynets and D. Korobeinikov. The plasterer M. I. Nosik did a big job. The window blocks were made by the Besstannikovs from Gar.

Old Believer Alexander Chetvergov (later Metropolitan ) from Kazan created the project of the iconostasis and built it himself, he also painted five icons for the church, gilded all the crosses of the cathedral and, in addition, on September 17, 1999, set the cross of the central dome.

Construction financing
During the construction of the church, there was often a shortage of funding, and construction stopped. Help was provided by Metropolitan Alimpiy. Old Believers from other Russian parishes collected donations. Help was provided by Old Believers from Alaska and Australia. The Novosibirsk City Hall and the Novosibirsk Oblast Government also helped the community.

Consecration
On September 19, 1999, Metropolitan Alimpy consecrated the Cathedral of the Nativity of the Blessed Virgin Mary. A large number of people attended the consecration ceremony: clergy and laity, Russian Old Believers and Old Believers from other countries.

External links
 Новосибирск. Собор Рождества Пресвятой Богородицы. Народный каталог православной культуры. Cathedral of the Nativity of the Blessed Virgin Mary. Folk catalog of Orthodox culture.

Churches in Novosibirsk
Zayeltsovsky City District, Novosibirsk
Churches completed in 1999
Russian Orthodox cathedrals in Russia
1999 establishments in Russia
20th-century churches in Russia
20th-century Eastern Orthodox church buildings